The Pomeranz–Fritsch reaction, also named Pomeranz–Fritsch cyclization, is a named reaction in organic chemistry. It is named after Paul Fritsch (1859–1913) and Cäsar Pomeranz (1860–1926). In general it is a  synthesis of isoquinoline.

General Reaction Scheme 
The reaction below shows the acid-promoted synthesis of isoquinoline from benzaldehyde and a 2,2-dialkoxyethylamine.

Various alkyl groups, e.g. methyl and ethyl groups, can be used as substituent R.

In the archetypical reaction sulfuric acid was used as proton donor, but Lewis acids such as trifluoroacetic anhydride and lanthanide triflates have been used occasionally.
Later, a wide range of diverse isoquinolines were successfully prepared.

Reaction Mechanism 
A possible mechanism is depicted below:

First the benzalaminoacetal 1 is built by the condensation of benzaldehyde and a 2,2-dialkoxyethylamine. After the condensation a hydrogen-atom is added to one of the alkoxy groups. Subsequently, an alcohol is removed. Next, the compound 2 is built. After that a second hydrogen-atom is added to the compound. In the last step a second alcohol is removed and the bicyclic system becomes aromatic.

Applications 
The Pomeranz–Fritsch reaction has general application in the preparation of isoquinoline derivatives.
Isoquinolines find many applications, including:
topical anesthetics such as dimethisoquin:

vasodilators, a well-known example, papaverine, shown below.

See also
 Bischler–Napieralski reaction
 Pictet–Spengler reaction

References 

Nitrogen heterocycle forming reactions
Heterocycle forming reactions
Name reactions
Isoquinolines